Deep Blue: Chaos from Darkism II is an album by the band Balzac. One of the songs, "XXXxxx", is originally from their 2005 album Dark-Ism, and the track "D.A.R.K." is a re-mix of a song of the same name. It also features a cover version of David Bowie's "Ziggy Stardust".

The record has six different pieces of album art, and a limited number (1,000) of Deep Blue were supplied with a Skull-Bat toy. An even more limited number (308) of the Skull-Bat toys are red.

Track listing
"I Bring Death and Confrontation"
"Godless"
"The Scare"
"In Those Days"
"D.A.R.K."
"Horrorock"
"Ziggy Stardust"
"The Gaze"
"(#2)"
"Deep Blue"
"Japanese Chaos"
"XXXxxx"
"(#1)"
"Japanese Trash"
"I Can't Stand it Anymore"
"I'm Alone"

External links
Official Balzac Japan site
Official Balzac USA site
Official Balzac Europe site

2006 albums
Balzac (band) albums